A deejay or disc jockey is a person who hosts recorded music for an audience.

Deejay may also refer to:

 DeeJay TV, an Italian entertainment channel
 Deejay (Jamaican), a person who verbalizes with music in the Jamaican style
 Deejay Kriel (born 1995), a South African professional boxer
 Dee Jay, a fictional character in the Street Fighter series

See also
 DJ (disambiguation)
 Djay (disambiguation)